Sun Channel (previously Sun Channel Tourism Television) is a cable channel based in Venezuela. It specializes in tourism and traveling, similar to channels like Travel Channel and TLC.

Sun Channel Tourism Television is a Venezuelan cable television network. Its programming is oriented to entertain and inform TV viewers by offering different options about choosing a traveling destiny across Latin America and the rest of the world. The programming content includes themes related with traveling and  tourism: destination, gastronomy, culture, history, entertaining, sports, shopping and adventure, are among of the subjects that can be enjoyed by the Sun Channels programming.

Abroad 
Sun Channel Tourism Television can be viewed in almost all American continents and in some European countries.